David Stuart Walker  (born 30 May 1957) is a British Anglican bishop. Since 2013, he has been the Bishop of Manchester. He had previously been the Bishop of Dudley, a suffragan bishop in the Diocese of Worcester, from 2000 to 2013.

Early life
Walker was born on 30 May 1957. He was educated at Manchester Grammar School, then an all-boys direct grant grammar school in Manchester. He competed in the International Mathematical Olympiad in 1975. Walker studied at King's College, Cambridge. He trained for ministry at Queen's College, Edgbaston.

Ordained ministry
Walker was ordained in the Church of England: made a deacon at Petertide 1983 (3 July) and ordained a priest the Petertide following (1 July 1984), both times by David Lunn, Bishop of Sheffield, at Sheffield Cathedral. Walker's ordained ministry began as a curate at St Mary Handsworth, after which he was a team vicar at Maltby, then Bramley before ordination to the episcopate.

Walker was consecrated as a bishop on 30 November 2000 by George Carey, Archbishop of Canterbury, at St Paul's Cathedral. During his time as Bishop of Dudley, Walker was Acting Bishop of Worcester (as the sole suffragan of the diocese) during the 2007 interregnum between the retirement of Peter Selby and confirmation of John Inge.

Walker's nomination to be the next Bishop of Manchester was announced on 5 June 2013; his canonical election to the see was confirmed on 7 October 2013; and he was enthroned at Manchester Cathedral on 30 November 2013. Walker was awarded a doctorate in 2014 after research, at Warwick University, on how people belong to their churches, particularly in rural Anglicanism.

Since 2014, Walker has been vice-president of Affirming Catholicism. He is a member of the Third Order of the Society of St Francis (TSSF).

Walker was introduced into the House of Lords on 7 September 2020.

Views
Walker supports the introduction of same-sex marriage in the Church of England: "I would be delighted to serve as bishop in a church that fully celebrated the committed, exclusive and faithful love of two adults, regardless of whether they were of same or different sexes".

Personal life
Walker is a keen hill walker. He married Susan in 1980 and together they have two children; he ordained her deacon at Manchester Cathedral on 1 July 2018, to serve as assistant curate in Prestwich.

Styles
The Reverend David Walker (1983–2000)
The Right Reverend David Walker (2000–2014)
The Right Reverend Doctor David Walker (2014–present)

References

1957 births
People educated at Manchester Grammar School
Alumni of King's College, Cambridge
Alumni of the Queen's Foundation
21st-century Church of England bishops
Living people
Bishops of Dudley
Bishops of Manchester
Lords Spiritual
International Mathematical Olympiad participants